The Florida Complex League Pirates are a Rookie-level affiliate of the Pittsburgh Pirates, competing in the Florida Complex League of Minor League Baseball. Prior to 2021, the team was known as the Gulf Coast League Pirates. The team plays its home games in Bradenton, Florida, at the Pirate City complex. The team is composed mainly of players who are in their first year of professional baseball either as draftees or non-drafted free agents from the United States, Canada, Dominican Republic, Venezuela, and other countries.

History
The team was first established in 1968, and has competed continuously since then. The team won division championships in 2002, 2003, 2008, and 2013. In 2012, the team won its first league championship.

In 2009, the team had nine players each from the Dominican Republic and Venezuela, with the United States third at six players. There were the two highly publicized, pioneering Indian pitchers, Rinku Singh and Dinesh Patel, who became the first Indian-born players to sign professional baseball contracts in the United States, a second baseman named Henry Henry from Colombia, two players from Puerto Rico, and one each from Mexico, Panama, Australia, Canada and one of the first three players ever signed out of South Africa, Gift Ngoepe, while one of the Americans, Chris Aure, was from Alaska. "We eat together in the cafeteria, but sometimes we try each other's foods," Ngoepe says. "I listen to the Indians' music when I go past their rooms, and they listen to my music from Africa. We tell each other stories about our home countries. We do everything together." "Everybody's the same here, like family," Venezuelan infielder Elevys Gonzalez says.

For the 2021 season, the team is fielding two squads in the league, differentiated as "Black" and "Gold" in reference to the team's colors.

Season-by-season

Rosters

References

External links
 Official website

Baseball teams established in 1968
Florida Complex League teams
Professional baseball teams in Florida
Pittsburgh Pirates
G
1968 establishments in Florida